The 2011 Mountain West Conference men's basketball tournament was played at the Thomas & Mack Center in Las Vegas, Nevada from March 8–12, 2011. The tournament is sponsored by Conoco. The first round game and all four quarterfinals were televised live on the MountainWest Sports Network. The semifinals were televised on CBS College Sports Network, with the championship game on Versus. San Diego State, the winner of the tournament, received the automatic bid to the NCAA tournament. BYU's Jimmer Fredette was selected as the tournament MVP.

Bracket

External links

Tournament
Mountain West Conference men's basketball tournament
Mountain West Conference men's basketball tournament
Mountain West Conference men's basketball tournament